Cavalry Corps may refer to:
 Cavalry Corps (France)
 Cavalry Corps (Ireland)
 Cavalry corps (Red Army)
 Cavalry Corps (Union Army)
 Cavalry Corps (United Kingdom)